Papis Malaly Dembélé (born 17 June 1997) is a French professional footballer who plays as a forward for Turkish club Bandırmaspor.

Career
In May 2017, Dembélé signed his first professional contract with a three-year deal. On 28 July 2017, he made his debut in a 3–1 Ligue 2 defeat to US Orléans.

On 3 August 2022, Dembélé signed a two-year contract with Bandırmaspor in Turkey.

Personal life
Malaty is of Malian descent.

Career statistics

References

1997 births
Living people
French footballers
French expatriate footballers
French sportspeople of Malian descent
Black French sportspeople
Association football forwards
AS Nancy Lorraine players
Rodez AF players
Bandırmaspor footballers
Ligue 2 players
Championnat National 3 players
TFF First League players
Expatriate footballers in Turkey
French expatriate sportspeople in Turkey